Osama Al-Samman  (born 26 March 1986 in Syria) is a Syrian civil society activist. He moved to Egypt to pursue higher education, during which time the Tunisian revolution started.

The first role that he took on as a revolutionary was that of a media activist. Gradually, however, he transitioned to the political realm.

Contributions to the Syrian uprising
Al-Samman’s revolutionary activities commenced after the Syrian Day of Rage, February 5, 2011, when he began producing protest videos. He also worked as a media spokesperson for the city of Al-Tall.

He was involved in various media campaigns that sought to shed light on the plight of Syrian prisoners of consciousness. The most prominent campaign he participated in was that for blogger RazanGhazzawi, which received the 2012 BOBs Award for the Best Social Activism Campaign.

When Suheir Attasi, a member of SRGU, was appointed to the Syrian National Coalition the Syrian National Coalition, SRGU subsequently appointed Al-Samman to manage her presidential office. He was among the eighteen individuals who represented the Syrian opposition at the 2013 Arab League summit.

Conferences
 Antakya Conference “ first Conference of the Syria revolution”
 Syrian National Salvation Conference
 1st Cairo Conference 
 1st and 2nd Syrian Democratic Platform Conferences
 Syrian Writers Association 
 2nd and 3rd Friends of Syria Conferences
 Arab League Summit (where he acted as a representative of the Syrian opposition)

References

External links
youtube.com "interview with osama al samman activist talking about social media in revolution of Syria" , antalya ,29 May 2011 barada tv   
 Article of "revolution and free army and Syria future" osama alsamman 16 sep 2012 
Resistance civil and democratic state by osama alsamman alqudsalarabi,london , 27 jun 2012
 "لقاء مع سميح شقير"  qatr,qatara conference, 2012
youtube.com osama talk who member of the Syrian Democratic Platform 

Syrian democracy activists
Syrian dissidents
Living people
1986 births
War correspondents of the Syrian civil war